Prince Royce is an American singer-songwriter who has received awards and nominations for his contributions to the music industry, in the genre of bachata. His eponymous debut studio album has sold over 500,000 copies in the United States. It received a Latin Grammy Award nomination for Best Contemporary Tropical Album, gaining Royce his first Latin Grammy Award nomination in 2011. It followed up with two nominations for Tropical Album of the Year at the Billboard Music Awards in 2011 and 2012. At the Latin counterpart, it received two nominations for Tropical Album of the Year in 2011 and 2012, both of which he won. The album also won Album of the Year at the 2012 award show. A number of the singles from the album also received awards and nominations at the award shows including "Stand By Me", "Corazón Sin Cara", "El Amor Que Perdimos" and "Mi Última Carta".

Prince Royce's second studio album, Phase II (2012) has sold over 250,000 copies in the United States. At the Latin Grammy Awards of 2012, the album received a nomination for Best Tropical Fusion Album. The album also received a Billboard Music Award for Latin Album of the Year and Billboard Latin Music Award nomination for Album of the Year. Its two singles, "Las Cosas Pequeñas" and "Incondicional", were also successful in garnering awards and nominations. At the Billboard Latin Music Awards of 2013, the two singles were nominated for Tropical Song of the Year, which was eventually won by the former. As of October 2013, Royce has received 75 awards from 153 nominations.

Latin Grammy Awards
The Latin Grammy Awards are awarded annually by the Latin Academy of Recording Arts & Sciences in the United States. Prince Royce has received nine nominations.

|-
| 
| Prince Royce
| Best Contemporary Tropical Album
| 
|-
| 
| "Ven Conmigo" (Daddy Yankee featuring Prince Royce)
| Best Urban Song
| 
|-
| 
| Phase II
| Best Tropical Fusion Album
| 
|-
|rowspan="4" scope="row"| 
|rowspan="3" scope="row"| "Darte un Beso"
|scope="row"| Record of the Year
| 
|-
|scope="row"| Song of the Year
| 
|-
|scope="row"| Best Tropical Song
| 
|-
|scope="row"| Soy el Mismo
|scope="row"| Best Contemporary Tropical Album
| 
|-
|
|scope="row"| "Back It Up (Spanish Version)"
|scope="row"| Best Urban Song
| 
|-
|
|scope="row"| "La Carretera"
|scope="row"| Best Tropical Song
| 
|-
|rowspan="3" scope="row"|2017
|scope="row"| El Dorado(as a featured artist)
|scope="row"| Album of the Year
| 
|-
|scope="row"| Five
|scope="row"| Best Contemporary Tropical Album
| 
|-
|scope="row"| "Deja Vu"
|scope="row"| Best Tropical Song
| 
|-
|rowspan="1" scope="row"|2018 
|scope="row"| Sensualidad 
|scope="row"| Best Urban Song
| 
|-
|rowspan="1" scope="row"|2020
|scope="row"| Alter Ego
|scope="row"| Best Contemporary Tropical Album
| 
|-

Billboard Music Awards
The Billboard Music Awards are awarded annually by the Billboard magazine in the United States. Royce has received ten nominations.

|-
|rowspan="2" scope="row"| 2011
|scope="row"| Himself
|scope="row"| Top Latin Artist
| 
|-
|scope="row"| Prince Royce
|scope="row"| Top Latin Album
| 
|-
|rowspan="3" scope="row"| 2012
|scope="row"| Himself
|scope="row"| Top Latin Artist
| 
|-
|scope="row"| Prince Royce
|scope="row"| Top Latin Album
| 
|-
|scope="row"| "Corazón Sin Cara"
|scope="row"| Top Latin Song
| 
|-
|rowspan="2" scope="row"| 2013
|scope="row"| Himself
|scope="row"| Top Latin Artist
| 
|-
|scope="row"| Phase II
|scope="row"| Top Latin Album
| 
|-
|rowspan="3" scope="row"| 2014
|scope="row"| Himself
|scope="row"| Top Latin Artist
| 
|-
|scope="row"| Soy el Mismo
|scope="row"| Top Latin Album
| 
|-
|scope="row"| "Darte un Beso"
|scope="row"| Top Latin Song
| 
|-

Billboard Latin Music Awards
The Billboard Latin Music Awards are awarded annually by the Billboard magazine in the United States. Royce has received eighteen awards from forty-two nominations.

|-
|rowspan="6" scope="row"| 2011
|rowspan="5" scope="row"| Himself
| Latin Artist of the Year, New
| 
|-
| Hot Latin Songs Artist of the Year, Male
| 
|-
| Top Latin Albums Artist of the Year, Male
| 
|-
| Tropical Airplay Artist of the Year, Solo
| 
|-
| Tropical Albums Artist of the Year, Solo
| 
|-
| Prince Royce
| Tropical Album of the Year
| 
|-
|rowspan="10"| 2012
|rowspan="5"| Himself
| Hot Latin Songs Artist of the Year
| 
|-
| Hot Latin Songs Artist of the Year, Male
| 
|-
| Top Latin Albums Artist of the Year, Male
| 
|-
| Tropical Song Artist of the Year, Solo
| 
|-
| Tropical Album Artist of the Year, Solo
| 
|-
|rowspan="3"| "Corazón Sin Cara"
| Song of the Year
| 
|-
| Airplay Song of the Year
| 
|-
| Tropical Song of the Year
| 
|-
|rowspan="2"|Prince Royce
| Album of the Year
| 
|-
| Tropical Album of the Year
| 
|-
|rowspan="11"| 2013
|rowspan="5"| Himself
| Artist of the Year
| 
|-
| Songs Artist of the Year, Male
| 
|-
| Albums Artist of the Year, Male
| 
|-
| Tropical Songs Artist of the Year, Solo
| 
|-
| Tropical Albums Artist of the Year, Solo
| 
|-
|rowspan="4"| Phase II
|-
| Album of the Year
| 
|-
| Digital Album of the Year
| 
|-
| Tropical Album of the Year
| 
|-
|"Incondicional"
|rowspan="2"|Tropical Song of the Year
| 
|-
|"Las Cosas Pequeñas"
| 
|-
|rowspan="16" scope="row"| 2014
|rowspan="7" scope="row"| Himself
|scope="row"| Artist of the Year
| 
|-
|scope="row"|Hot Latin Songs Artist of the Year, Male
|
|-
|scope="row"|Social Artist of the Year, Solo
|
|-
|scope="row"|Top Latin Albums Artist of the Year, Male
|
|-
|scope="row"|Latin Pop Songs Artist of the Year, Solo
|
|-
|scope="row"|Tropical Songs Artist of the Year, Solo
|
|-
|scope="row"|Tropical Albums Artist of the Year, Solo
|
|-
|rowspan="6" scope="row"| "Darte un Beso"
|scope="row"|Hot Latin Song of the Year
|
|-
|scope="row"|Airplay Song of the Year
|
|-
|scope="row"|Digital Song of the Year
|
|-
|scope="row"|Streaming Song of the Year
|
|-
|scope="row"|Latin Pop Song of the Year
|
|-
|scope="row"|Tropical Song of the Year
|
|-
|scope="row"| "Te Perdiste Mi Amor" (with Thalía)
|scope="row"|Hot Latin Song of the Year, Vocal Event
|
|-
|scope="row"| #1's
|rowspan="2" scope="row"|Tropical Album of the Year
|
|-
|scope="row"|Soy el Mismo
|
|-
|rowspan="3" scope="row"| 2015
|rowspan="3" scope="row"| Himself
|scope="row"|Artist of the Year
| 
|-
|scope="row"|Hot Latin Songs Artist of the Year, Male
| 
|-
|scope="row"|Tropical Songs Artist of the Year, Solo
| 
|-
|rowspan="2" scope="row"| 2016
|rowspan="2" scope="row"| Himself
|scope="row"|Artist of the Year
| 
|-
|scope="row"|Tropical Songs Artist of the Year, Solo
| 
|-
|rowspan="3" scope="row"| 2017
|rowspan="1" scope="row"| Himself
|scope="row"|Tropical Songs Artist of the Year, Solo
| 
|-
|rowspan="2" scope="row"| “La Carretera”
|scope="row"| Airplay Song of the Year
| 
|-
|scope="row"|Tropical Song of the Year
| 
|-
|rowspan="3" scope="row"| 2018
|rowspan="1" scope="row"| Himself
|scope="row"|Tropical Songs Artist of the Year, Solo
| 
|-
|rowspan="1" scope="row"| “Déjà Vu” (with Shakira)
|scope="row"| Tropical Song of the Year
| 
|-
|scope="row"| “Five”
|scope="row"| Tropical Album of the Year
| 
|-
|scope="row"| 2019
|rowspan="2" scope="row"| Himself
|rowspan="2" scope="row"| Tropical Artist of the Year
|
|-
| scope="row"| 2020
|

American Music Awards
The American Music Awards are awarded annually by the American Broadcasting Company in the United States. Royce has received one nomination.

|-
| 2013
| Himself
| Favorite Latin Artist
| 
|-

BMI Awards
Broadcast Music, Inc. (BMI) annually hosts award shows that honor the songwriters, composers and music publishers of the year's most-performed songs in the BMI catalog. Royce has received nine awards from nine nominations.<ref>BMI Awards:

2012 Awards: 

2013 Awards: 

'2014 Awards: </ref>

|-
|2012
|scope="row"|"Corazón Sin Cara"
|scope="row"|Award-Winning Songs
|
|-
|rowspan="5" scope="row"|2013
|scope="row"|Himself
| scope="row"|Latin Songwriter of the Year
|
|-
|scope="row"|"El Amor Que Perdimos"
|rowspan="7" scope="row"|Award-Winning Songs
|
|-
|scope="row"|"Mi Última Carta"
|
|-
|scope="row"|"Ven Conmigo" (Daddy Yankee featuring Prince Royce)
|
|-
|scope="row"|"Las Cosas Pequeñas"
|
|-
|rowspan="3" scope="row"|2014
|scope="row"|"Incondicional"
|
|-
|scope="row"|"Te Me Vas"
|
|-
|scope="row"|"Te Perdiste Mi Amor"
|
|-

iHeartRadio Music Awards

|-
|rowspan=2|2017
|Himself
|Latin Artist of the Year
|
|-
|"La Carretera"
|Latin Song of the Year
|
|}

 Latin America Music Awards 

|-
|rowspan=2|2015
|rowspan=1|"Solita"
|Favorite Song—Tropical
|
|-
|rowspan=1|"Back It Up" ft. Jennifer Lopez
|Favorite Dance Song
|
|-
|rowspan=2|2016
|rowspan=1| "Culpa Al Corazón"
|Favorite Song—Tropical
|
|-
|rowspan=1|Himself
|Favorite Artist—Tropical
|
|-
|rowspan=5|2017
|rowspan=2|"Deja Vu" ft. Shakira
|Song of the Year
|
|-
|Favorite Song—Tropical
|
|-
|rowspan=2|"Five"
|Album of the Year
|
|-
|Favorite Album—Tropical
|
|-
|rowspan=1|Himself
|Favorite Artist—Tropical
|
|}

Latin Songwriters Hall of Fame
The Latin Songwriters Hall of Fame are awarded annually by the organization of the same name in the United States. Royce has received one award.

|-
|rowspan="1" scope="row"| 2013
|rowspan="1" scope="row"| Himself
|scope="row"| La Musa Award
| 
|-

Premios Juventud
The Premios Juventud are awarded annually by the television network Univision in the United States. Royce has received seventeen awards from thirty-nine nominations.

|-
|rowspan="8" scope="row"| 2011
|rowspan="3"| Himself
| Favorite Tropical Artist
| 
|-
| Best Artist
| 
|-
| Follow me The Good
| 
|-
|rowspan="4" scope="row"| "Corazón Sin Cara"
| Catchiest Tune
| 
|-
| My Favorite Video
| 
|-
| Best Ballad
| 
|-
| My Ringtone
| 
|-
| Stand by Me Tour
| My Favorite Concert
| 
|-
|rowspan="10"| 2012
| "El Verdadero Amor Perdona"
|rowspan="2"| The Perfect Combination
| 
|-
| "Ven Conmigo"
| 
|-
| Euphoria (with Enrique Iglesias and Pitbull)
| My Favorite Concert
| 
|-
|rowspan="4"| "Las Cosas Pequeñas"
| Catchiest Tune
| 
|-
| Best Ballad
| 
|-
| My Favorite Video
| 
|-
| My Ringtone
| 
|-
|rowspan="3"| Himself
| Favorite Tropical Artist
| 
|-
| All Over the Dial
| 
|-
| Follow Me The Good
| 
|-
|rowspan="10"| 2013
|| "Te Perdiste Mi Amor" 
| The Perfect Combination
| 
|- 
|rowspan="3"| Himself
| Favorite Tropical Artist
| 
|-
| Voice of the Moment 
| 
|-
| Follow Me The Good
| 
|-
|rowspan="4"| "Incondicional"
| Catchiest Tune
| 
|-
| My Favorite Video
| 
|-
| Best Ballad
| 
|-
| My Ringtone
| 
|-
|| Phase II| I Play It All
| 
|-
|| Phase II Tour
| My Favorite Concert
| 
|-
|rowspan="11"| 2014
|| Soy el Mismo| Favorite Album
| 
|- 
|"Darte un Beso"
| rowspan="2"|Favorite Song
| 
|-
| "Te Robaré"
| 
|-
|"Darte un Beso"
| rowspan="3"|My Favorite Video
| 
|-
| "Te Robaré"
| 
|-
| "Nada"
| 
|-
| "Darte un Beso"
| rowspan="2"|Favorite Ringtone
| 
|-
| "Te Robaré"
| 
|-
| rowspan="4"|Himself
| Favorite Hispanic Tropical Artist
| 
|-
| Favorite Personality in Social Media
| 
|-
| Favorite Artist
| 
|- 
|rowspan="1"| 2015
| Artist of the Moment
| 
|-
|rowspan="3"| 2016
|"Back it Up" ft. Jennifer Lopez & Pitbull
| Best Collaboration
| 
|-
| rowspan="2"|Himself
| Favorite Tropical Artist
| 
|-
| Favorite Twitter
| 
|-
| 2019
|Himself and Emeraude Toubia
| Best Couple
| 
|-

Premios Lo Nuestro
The Premios Lo Nuestro are awarded annually by the television network Univision in the United States. Royce has received sixteen awards from twenty-two nominations.

|-
|rowspan="5" scope="row"| 2011
| Prince Royce| Tropical Album of the Year
| 
|-
| "Stand by Me"
| Tropical Song of the Year
| 
|-
|rowspan="3" scope="row"| Himself
| Tropical Male Artist of the Year
| 
|-
| Breakout Artist or Group of the Year
| 
|-
| Tropical Traditional Artist of the Year
| 
|-
|rowspan="5" scope="row"| 2012
| "Ven Conmigo" (Daddy Yankee featuring Prince Royce)
| Collaboration of the Year
| 
|-
| "El Amor Que Perdimos"
| Tropical Song of the Year
| 
|-
| "Ven Conmigo" (Daddy Yankee featuring Prince Royce)
| Urban Song of the Year
| 
|-
|rowspan="2" scope="row"| Himself
| Tropical Male Artist of the Year
| 
|-
| Tropical Traditional Artist of the Year
| 
|-
|rowspan="7" scope="row"| 2013
|rowspan="2" scope="row"| "El Verdadero Amor Perdona" (Maná featuring Prince Royce)
| Collaboration of the Year
| 
|-
| Rock/Alternative Song of the Year
| 
|-
| Phase II| Tropical Album of the Year
| 
|-
| "Las Cosas Pequeñas"
|rowspan="2" scope="row"| Tropical Song of the Year
| 
|-
| "Incondicional"
| 
|-
|rowspan="2" scope="row"| Himself
| Tropical Male Artist of the Year
| 
|-
| Tropical Traditional Artist of the Year
| 
|-
|rowspan="5" scope="row"| 2014
|scope="row"| "Te Perdiste Mi Amor"
| Pop Song of the Year
| 
|-
| "Te Me Vas"
|scope="row"| Tropical Song of the Year
| 
|-
|rowspan="3" scope="row"| Himself
| Artist of the Year
| 
|-
| Tropical Male Artist of the Year
| 
|-
| Tropical Traditional Artist of the Year
| 
|-
|rowspan="4" scope="row"| 2016
|scope="row"| "Soy el Mismo (Deluxe Edition)"
| Tropical Album of the Year
| 
|-
|scope="row"| "Soy el Mismo"
| Tropical Song of the Year
| 
|-
|rowspan="2" scope="row"| Himself
| Tropical Artist of the Year
| 
|-
| Tropical Male Artist of the Year
| 
|-
|rowspan="4" scope="row"| 2017
|scope="row"| "Solo Yo" ft. Sofía Reyes
| Pop Song of the Year
| 
|-
|scope="row"| "Culpa al Corazón"
|rowspan="2"| Tropical Song of the Year
| 
|-
|"La Carretera"
| 
|-
|rowspan="1" scope="row"| Himself
| Tropical Artist of the Year
| 
|-
|rowspan="4" scope="row"| 2021
|scope="row"| Alter Ego| Album of the Year
| 
|-
|rowspan="2" scope="row"| "Carita de Inocente"
| Song of the Year
| 
|-
|Tropical Song of the Year
|
|-
|rowspan="1" scope="row"| Himself
| Tropical Artist of the Year
|
|-

Premios Tu Mundo
The Premios Tu Mundo (Spanish for Your World Awards) is an annual award presented by American television network Telemundo. The awards celebrates the achievements of Hispanics and Latinos in the media including TV shows, movies, music, fashion, and sports.

|-
| rowspan="2" scope="row"| 2012
| scope="row"| Himself
| scope="row"| #MostSocial
| 
|-
| scope="row"| "Las cosas pequeñas"
| scope="row"| Song That Steals My Heart
| 
|-
| rowspan="2" scope="row"| 2013
| scope="row"| Himself
| scope="row"| #MostSocial
| 
|-
| scope="row"| " Incondicional"
| scope="row"| Most Popular Song of the Year
| 
|-
| rowspan="2" scope="row"| 2014
| rowspan="6" scope="row"| Himself
| scope="row"| Favorite Tropical Artist
| 
|-
| scope="row"| Fan Club of the Year
| 
|-
| rowspan="1" scope="row"| 2015
| scope="row"| Favorite Pop Artist
| 
|-
| rowspan="2" scope="row"| 2016
| scope="row"| Favorite Tropical Artist
| 
|-
| scope="row"| Fan Club of the Year
| 
|-
| rowspan="2" scope="row"| 2017
| scope="row"| Favorite Tropical Artist
| 
|-

MTV Video Music Awards
The MTV Video Music Awards are awarded annually by the cable channel MTV in the United States. Royce has received one nomination.

|-
| scope="row"| 2011
| scope="row"| Himself
| scope="row"| Best Latino Artist
| 
|-

MTV Millennial Awards

|-
| scope="row"| 2018
| scope="row"| "Sensualidad" (ft.Bad Bunny and J Balvin)
| scope="row"| Collaboration of the Year
| 
|-

Soberano Awards
The Soberano Awards are awarded annually by the Asociación de Cronistas de Arte of the Dominican Republic in the Dominican Republic. Royce has received two awards from twelve nominations.

|-
|rowspan="3" scope="row"| 2011
|rowspan="2" scope="row"| Himself
|scope="row"| New Artist of the Year
| 
|-
|scope="row"| Most-Played Artist on Radio
| 
|-
|scope="row"| Prince Royce|scope="row"| Album of the Year
| 
|-
|rowspan="3" scope="row"| 2012
|rowspan="2" scope="row"| Himself
|scope="row"| Concert of the Year
| 
|-
|scope="row"| Most-Played Artist on Radio
| 
|-
|scope="row"| "Mi Ultima Carta"
|scope="row"| Bachata Song of the Year
| 
|-
|rowspan="3" scope="row"| 2013
|scope="row"| Himself
|scope="row"| Most-Played Artist on Radio
| 
|-
|scope="row"| "Las Cosas Pequeñas"
|scope="row"| Bachata Song of the Year
| 
|-
|scope="row"| Phase II|scope="row"| Album of the Year
| 
|-
|rowspan="3" scope="row"| 2014
|rowspan="2" scope="row"| Himself
| Most-Played Artist on Radio
| 
|-
|scope="row"| Composer of the Year
| 
|-
|scope="row"| "Darte un Beso"
|scope="row"| Bachata Song of the Year
| 
|-
|rowspan="2" scope="row"| 2018
|rowspan="1" scope="row"| Himself
| Artist or Group living out of the Year
| 
|-
|rowspan="1" scope="row"| Deja Vu'' (ft. Shakira)
| Collaboration of the Year
| 
|-

References

Prince Royce